The 1998 NBA Finals was the championship round of the 1998 playoffs of the National Basketball Association (NBA) and the conclusion of the 1997–98 NBA season. The two-time defending NBA champion and Eastern Conference champion Chicago Bulls played against the Western Conference champion Utah Jazz, with the Jazz holding home-court advantage for the first 2 games in Salt Lake City. In a repeat of the previous year's Finals, the Bulls won the series 4 games to 2 for their third consecutive NBA title and their sixth in eight seasons.

Michael Jordan was voted the NBA Finals MVP of the series (he also had won the award the last five times the Bulls won the Finals: 1991, 1992, 1993, 1996, and 1997). This would be his sixth NBA championship and sixth Finals MVP award in six full basketball seasons. This would be his final season of winning the NBA championship and Finals MVP.

The 1998 Finals garnered the highest Nielsen TV ratings in NBA history at 18.7, and even surpassed the Nielsen ratings for the 1998 World Series, marking the first time the NBA had a higher rating in its championship round than of Major League Baseball's championship round. The Bulls headed into the series as the underdogs. Bulls' small forward Scottie Pippen stated, "It's a different feeling. We’ve never been in this situation where we’ve sort of been written off. It’s a great feeling being the underdog because you want to go out now and prove everybody wrong."

Background
The series marked the first time since 1989 that the same two teams met in the Finals in consecutive years. The Jazz earned the league's best record by virtue of sweeping the two-game regular season series with the Bulls despite both teams finishing at 62 wins. In the playoffs, the Jazz were pushed to the brink by the Houston Rockets before winning Game 5 in Utah, and then overcame Rookie of the Year Tim Duncan and the San Antonio Spurs 4–1. They then swept the Los Angeles Lakers in the Western Conference Finals. The Bulls swept the New Jersey Nets and then took out the Charlotte Hornets in five, but it took seven games to overcome the Indiana Pacers in the Eastern Conference Finals.

Road to the Finals

Regular season series
The Utah Jazz won both games in the regular season series:

1998 NBA Finals rosters

Chicago Bulls

Utah Jazz

Series summary

Bulls win the series 4–2.

Game 1

Game 2

Game 3

Game 4
Crowd: 24,000 at United Center(sellout)

Game 5

Game 6

Game summaries

Games 1 and 2
Unlike the 1997 Finals, the Jazz and Bulls entered this series as equals. The Jazz had won both regular season meetings with the Bulls, and many analysts predicted a hard-fought seven-game series. The two teams entered the Finals on completely different notes; the Jazz uneventfully swept the Los Angeles Lakers in the Western Conference Finals and had a total of ten days' rest before the Finals began. The Bulls, meanwhile, endured a hard-fought series against a resurgent Indiana Pacers team helmed by Larry Bird (in his first year as head coach). They would need all seven games to get past the Pacers and would have only two days' rest before having to travel to Utah. Predictions of a Jazz championship were strengthened with their 88–85 Game 1 victory in overtime in Utah, with Scottie Pippen just missing a 3-pointer at the buzzer. True to form, the Bulls tied the series in Game 2 while putting together a huge fourth-quarter run to silence the Delta Center and holding on to win 93–88, finally securing their first victory against Utah all season. Karl Malone shot very poorly in the first two games of the series with some misses including one layup in Game 2 that hit the underside of the rim. The plane took 48 hours to get to the United Center or the airport.

Games 3–5
The Finals moved to Chicago with control of the series at stake in Game 3. In a 96–54 loss, the Jazz set the record for the 42 point loss in Finals history and were hammered by the media for the score, as well as the lowest number of points scored in any NBA game (since eclipsed by a score of 49 from the Bulls on April 10, 1999) since the inception of the shot clock. Every player on the Bulls roster scored at least once, with the Bulls' last-remaining scoreless player, backup center Bill Wennington, nailing his bucket with only 5.2 seconds remaining in the game.

Chicago won Game 4 in a close game, 86-82, and Utah took Game 5 83–81 despite nearly blowing a seven-point lead in the last two minutes. Karl Malone had his best game of the series with 39 points, while Antoine Carr made all five of his field goal attempts. The series returned to Utah with the Bulls leading 3-2.

Game 6

As they arrived at the Delta Center for Game 6, things didn't look good for the Bulls. Scottie Pippen, whose back was already injured going into the game, aggravated his injury when he dunked the opening basket of the game. He scored only 8 points the whole game. To keep pace with Utah, the Bulls were forced to rely almost entirely on Michael Jordan, who scored 23 points in the first half. Emotions ran high at the Delta Center when the Jazz suffered a critical shot clock violation in the second quarter. Referee Dick Bavetta ruled that Howard Eisley did not get a successful 3-point shot off in time, although TV replays showed that the ball was out of Eisley's hands just before the shot clock hit zero. Later in the fourth quarter, Jordan's two free throws tied the game with only a minute left. The Jazz received some relief as John Stockton hit a 3 with 41.9 seconds left to give Utah an 86–83 lead and sent the Delta Center into a frenzy.

After Jordan made a layup to make it 86–85, the Bulls needed to stop the Jazz from scoring again. When John Stockton passed the ball to Karl Malone, Jordan stole the ball away and dribbled down the court. Guarding him was Bryon Russell, one of the Jazz's best defenders. With 10 seconds remaining, Jordan started to dribble right, then crossed over to his left. Jordan hit the 20-footer after crossing over Russell while apparently initiating contact, but replays would show that he did not, to give the Bulls an 87–86 lead with 5.2 seconds left. After a time-out, Stockton missed a potential game-winning 3-pointer, giving the Bulls their sixth NBA title in 8 years. Jordan, who scored 45 points, and whose game-winning shot has been immortalized around the world, was named Finals MVP for the sixth time.

Player statistics

Chicago Bulls

|-
| align="left" |  || 2 || 0 || 3.5 || .333 || .000 || .000 || 1.0 || 0.0 || 0.5 || 0.0 || 1.0
|-
| align="left" |  || 6 || 0 || 5.2 || .600 || .667 || .000 || 0.3 || 0.3 || 0.2 || 0.2 || 1.3
|-
| align="left" |  || 6 || 0 || 14.0 || .409 || .250 || .667 || 2.5 || 0.0 || 1.2 || 0.0 || 3.5
|-
| align="left" |  || 6 || 6 || 28.7 || .364 || .167 || .583 || 4.5 || 2.8 || 1.5 || 0.7 || 5.3
|-! style="background:#FDE910;"
| align="left" |  || 6 || 6 || 41.7 || .427 || .308 || .814 || 4.0 || 2.3 || 1.8 || 0.7 || 33.5
|-
| align="left" |  || 6 || 0 || 20.7 || .350 || .385 || 1.000 || 0.3 || 2.5 || 0.3 || 0.0 || 3.8
|-
| align="left" |  || 6 || 6 || 37.0 || .500 || .304 || .615 || 4.7 || 2.7 || 1.2 || 0.7 || 15.2
|-
| align="left" |  || 6 || 6 || 21.7 || .444 || .000 || .750 || 4.8 || 1.5 || 0.8 || 0.8 || 5.0
|-
| align="left" |  || 6 || 6 || 39.5 || .410 || .231 || .833 || 6.8 || 4.8 || 1.7 || 0.8 || 15.7
|-
| align="left" |  || 6 || 0 || 30.5 || .462 || .000 || .667 || 8.3 || 1.0 || 1.2 || 0.3 || 3.3
|-
| align="left" |  || 3 || 0 || 4.3 || .400 || .000 || .000 || 1.0 || 0.3 || 0.0 || 0.3 || 1.3

Utah Jazz

|-
| align="left" |  || 6 || 0 || 21.0 || .500 || .333 || .818 || 2.7 || 0.3 || 0.2 || 0.2 || 7.3
|-
| align="left" |  || 6 || 0 || 14.3 || .500 || .000 || .750 || 2.0 || 0.0 || 0.0 || 0.2 || 4.2
|-
| align="left" |  || 6 || 0 || 17.5 || .375 || .143 || 1.000 || 2.0 || 3.8 || 0.3 || 0.2 || 4.7
|-
| align="left" |  || 6 || 2 || 10.5 || .267 || .000 || .000 || 2.3 || 0.0 || 0.2 || 0.3 || 1.3
|-
| align="left" |  || 6 || 6 || 34.2 || .411 || .333 || .833 || 2.7 || 2.7 || 0.8 || 0.2 || 10.7
|-
| align="left" |  || 5 || 3 || 12.0 || .429 || .000 || .500 || 3.4 || 0.2 || 0.4 || 0.0 || 2.8
|-
| align="left" |  || 6 || 6 || 40.5 || .504 || .000 || .789 || 10.5 || 3.8 || 1.0 || 1.2 || 25.0
|-
| align="left" |  || 6 || 0 || 17.5 || .393 || .000 || .667 || 2.5 || 0.5 || 0.3 || 0.2 || 4.3
|-
| align="left" |  || 5 || 1 || 11.0 || .417 || .000 || 1.000 || 3.2 || 0.0 || 0.0 || 0.2 || 2.2
|-
| align="left" |  || 6 || 6 || 36.0 || .409 || .286 || .688 || 5.0 || 1.3 || 1.2 || 0.2 || 8.8
|-
| align="left" |  || 6 || 6 || 32.3 || .490 || .222 || .727 || 2.5 || 8.7 || 2.0 || 0.0 || 9.7
|-
| align="left" |  || 1 || 0 || 7.0 || .000 || .000 || .000 || 2.0 || 0.0 || 0.0 || 0.0 || 0.0

Media coverage
The Finals were televised in the United States by NBC, with Bob Costas on play-by-play and Doug Collins and Isiah Thomas serving as color analysts. Hannah Storm hosted the pre-game show, assisted by Bill Walton, John Salley and Peter Vescey, and Ahmad Rashad and Jim Gray reported from the sidelines. This was the first time since NBC took over the broadcasting rights to the NBA Finals in 1991 that Marv Albert was not the play by play commentator. He was fired from NBC on September 25, 1997 for sexually assaulting a woman.

Aftermath
, this series remains the last Finals appearances for both the Bulls and Jazz. After the season, the Bulls dynasty broke up. Without its key personnel, the Bulls missed the playoffs in the lockout-shortened 1999 season, winning just 13 of 50 games. The Bulls would not make the postseason again until 2005.

Phil Jackson declined an offer from the team president to coach another season. He would come back as head coach of the Los Angeles Lakers in 1999, winning five NBA titles in two separate stints with the team before retiring in 2011. This would give Jackson 11 NBA Titles, the most for a coach in the history of the four major American sports leagues. Ron Harper followed Jackson to the Lakers and won championships during his final two seasons, in 2000 and 2001.

In January 1999, Michael Jordan announced his retirement for the second time; he would come out of retirement for the second and final time in 2001 with the Washington Wizards and played two seasons with the team. However, neither season ended with a playoff appearance. Scottie Pippen was traded to the Houston Rockets during the offseason and played his last season (2003–04) with the Bulls. Dennis Rodman, released by the Bulls in the offseason, signed with the Lakers mid-season, playing only 23 games before being released. In January 1999, the Bulls re-signed Steve Kerr and traded him to the San Antonio Spurs, where he would win two more championships in 1999 and 2003, his last year in the NBA.  Kerr would go on to win four championships as head coach of the Golden State Warriors in 2015, 2017, 2018, and 2022. Luc Longley also retired in 2001.

John Stockton and Karl Malone led the Jazz to playoff appearances each season through 2003, however each season featured a loss in the first or second round.  During the 2003 off-season, Stockton retired and Malone joined the Los Angeles Lakers.

See also
1998 NBA playoffs

References

External links

From NBA official site
 1998 Playoff Results
 1998 NBA Finals Recap
 
 Michael Jordan's Shot in Game 6

Other sites on the internet
 1998 NBA Finals Summary and Linescores
 Greatest Finals Moments
 Former NBA official's take on Jordan's series-winning shot
 

National Basketball Association Finals
Finals
Basketball competitions in Salt Lake City
NBA Finals
1990s in Chicago
1990s in Salt Lake City
NBA
NBA
June 1998 sports events in the United States
Basketball competitions in Chicago
1998 in sports in Illinois